U.S. Highway 60 (US 60) in Texas is a 210.70-mile-long (339.09 km) U.S. Highway that runs southwest to northeast through the Texas Panhandle.

Route description
US 60 enters Texas from New Mexico at Farwell, having just left a concurrency with US 70 and US 84 across the New Mexico state line in Texico. The route travels northeast through small towns in the western Panhandle, reaching an intersection with US 385 in Hereford. In Canyon, the highway turns north, merging with US 87 and then Interstate 27. The three routes run concurrently into Amarillo, where I-27 ends at an interchange with Interstate 40 and US 287. The freeway ends and splits into two one-way pairs of surface streets; westbound US 60 and northbound US 287 follow Buchanan Street, while eastbound US 60 and southbound US 87 follow Taylor Street. Upon reaching the north side of Amarillo, US 60 departs to the east on Amarillo Boulevard. This route is cosigned with Business I-40, and was part of the original route of US 66 through the city. US 60 and Business I-40 split just northeast of Rick Husband Amarillo International Airport, with US 60 continuing to the northeast. The route passes through Panhandle and Pampa, before beginning a  concurrency with US 83 in Hemphill County. The two routes split north of Canadian, with US 60 travelling northeast to the Oklahoma state line near Higgins in Lipscomb County.

History

The section of US 60 from New Mexico to Amarillo was originally a portion of the Ozark Trail and paralleled the Panhandle and Santa Fe Railway, part of the Atchison, Topeka and Santa Fe Railway. When Texas began numbering its highway system, the Ozark Trail received the number State Highway 13. By 1920, the entire US 60 route had been renumbered as State Highway 33, or its spur SH 33A, with the northeastern portion also following the AT&SF Railway. By the mid-1920s, the entire route had become an extension of the Abo Pass Highway, and was SH 33 along the entire length. In 1928, the AASHO added the highway to the U.S. Highway System as U.S. Highway 164, with the Texas section being signed in 1929. It was renumbered as US 60 on June 8, 1931, when the route was extended to Los Angeles, California, to make it a coast-to-coast highway.

Major intersections

References

 Texas
60
Transportation in Parmer County, Texas
Transportation in Castro County, Texas
Transportation in Deaf Smith County, Texas
Transportation in Randall County, Texas
Transportation in Potter County, Texas
Transportation in Carson County, Texas
Transportation in Gray County, Texas
Transportation in Roberts County, Texas
Transportation in Hemphill County, Texas
Transportation in Lipscomb County, Texas